David Michael Collenette, PC (born 24 June 1946) is a former Canadian politician. From 1974, until his retirement from politics in 2004, he was a member of the Liberal Party of Canada. A graduate from York University's Glendon College in 1969, he subsequently received his MA, in 2004 and LL.D for education in 2015 from the same university. He was first elected in the York East riding of Toronto to the House of Commons on 8 July 1974, in the Pierre Trudeau government and returned to Parliament in 1993 representing Don Valley East.

Collenette served as a Member of the Canadian House of Commons for more than 20 years. He was elected five times and defeated twice. He served in the Cabinet under three prime ministers - Pierre Trudeau, John Turner, and Jean Chrétien. He held several portfolios:
 Minister of State-Multiculturalism (1983–1984);
 Minister of National Defence (1993–1996);
 Minister of Veterans Affairs (1993–1996);
 Minister of Transport (1997–2003) and 
 Minister of Crown Corporations (2002–2003).  
During the constitutional debates of the early 1980s, he served as Parliamentary Secretary to the Government House leader and was assigned by the government to Westminster to represent Canada's interests.

He served as Chair of the House of Commons Special Energy Committee in 1982–83 dealing with legislation for the national energy program (NEP).

Politics 
Collenette was one of only three cabinet members to endorse Jean Chrétien in the 1984 Liberal Party of Canada leadership election, along with Charles Caccia and Roméo LeBlanc.

He also supported Chrétien in the 1990 leadership campaign.

Minister of National Defence
As Minister of Defence, Collenette oversaw the reorganization, restructuring and re-engineering of the department as part of the federal government's deficit cutting.  During this time the Canadian Forces were involved in challenging assignments in the Balkans, Haiti and Somalia.

During his tenure, Collenette was at the centre of the controversy over the establishment of a public inquiry into the Somalia Affair investigating war crimes committed by Canadian Soldiers during deployment in 1992 by the Mulroney Progressive Conservatives. The Chrétien government later decided to curtail the inquiry.

In October 1996, Collenette resigned from cabinet citing a letter that he had written on behalf of a constituent. An access to information request revealed Collenette broke ethical guidelines by writing the letter to the Immigration and Refugee Board. Collenette cited this violation as his official reason for resigning from cabinet but his resignation also served to remove him from the ongoing Somalia Affair controversy.

Minister of Transport
After a few months on the back benches, he was re-admitted to Cabinet in July 1997 and was appointed Minister of Transport. In this portfolio his most important decisions were those that led to the merging of Canadian Airlines and Air Canada, the divestment of CN Rail operations in Northern Manitoba to the favour of Omnitrax, and the pseudo-commercialisation of Port Authorities under the Canada Marine Act. He also successfully argued in the late 1990s for the first substantial increase in funding for Via Rail since cuts in 1981, 1990 and 1994.

On 11 September 2001, the Federal Aviation Administration (FAA) closed down U.S. airspace after a series of terrorist attacks on the World Trade Center and the Pentagon. Collenette acted swiftly and shut down Canadian airspace in order to take in diverted U.S.-bound international flights, launching Transport Canada's Operation Yellow Ribbon. Ultimately, 255 flights carrying 44,519 passengers were diverted to 15 Canadian airports. In the time that has followed, Collenette has applauded the way Canadians responded to the crisis. He, Chrétien, U.S. Ambassador to Canada Paul Cellucci, and other provincial and local officials presided over Canada's memorial service to mark the first anniversary of 9/11 at Gander International Airport in Newfoundland and Labrador. There, he helped Chrétien unveil a plaque, commemorating the acts of kindness seen for the diverted passengers not just in Gander, but across the country.

Regional Minister Responsible for the Greater Toronto Area 
As regional Minister for the Greater Toronto Area 1997–2003, Mr. Collenette oversaw federal infrastructure funding that resulted in the largest single expansion of cultural institutions in Canadian history at the Royal Ontario Museum, the Art Gallery of Ontario, the Four Seasons Centre for the Performing Arts, the National Ballet School, the Royal Conservatory of Music, the Roy Thompson Hall and the Gardiner Museum of Ceramic Art. He also initiated the second tranche of GTA infrastructure funding for $1 billion towards major GO Transit improvements, including the reopening of CN Bradford to Barrie line. Mr. Collenette promoted the concept of a rail link between Pearson Airport and downtown Toronto and under his leadership, planning, acquisition of property and a Solicitation of Interest the project was implemented. The highly successful link was subsequently built by Metrolinx and opened in 2016.

Collenette also designated the Oak Ridges Moraine portion of the Pickering Airport lands administered by Transport Canada, as open greenspace in perpetuity. These lands eventually became part of the Rouge National Urban Park, opened in 2015.

On 29 January 2004, Collenette announced his retirement from politics and went on to work in academia and as a consultant in the private sector. He is a member of the board of directors of the Chartered Institute of Logistics and Transport (North America) and of Harbourfront Corporation in Toronto. He also is a past member of the board at Toronto East General Hospital Foundation Campaign Executive Team and of the Glendon School of Public and International Affairs. Collenette was a Senior Counsel with Hill & Knowlton Canada, a public relations and communications firm until recently. He currently serves as Chair of the NATO Association of Canada.

City of Ottawa Transportation Task Force Committee 
On 19 January 2007, Ottawa Mayor Larry O'Brien named Collenette as the head of a volunteer Transportation Task Force Committee in which in a six-month period it reviewed the transportation issues across the city. It produced a report which suggested light-rail service expansion throughout the city of Ottawa, including an east–west route in a downtown tunnel, and several communities in Eastern Ontario as well as portions of the Outaouais region in Western Quebec. The Ottawa LRT opened in 2019. His report also suggested one to two new interprovincial bridge crossings between Gatineau and Ottawa over the next 30 years.

Ottawa Centre 
His wife, Penny Collenette was selected to be the Liberal candidate in the riding of Ottawa Centre for the 40th Canadian federal election and lost to incumbent NDP MP Paul Dewar.

Province of Ontario Special Advisor, High-Speed Rail 

David Collenette served as the Government of Ontario  Special Advisor for High-Speed Rail in the Windsor - Toronto corridor, from 2015 to 2018.

Electoral record

References

External links 

 David Collenette homepage

1946 births
Living people
Canadian Anglicans
English emigrants to Canada
Members of the 22nd Canadian Ministry
Members of the 23rd Canadian Ministry
Members of the 26th Canadian Ministry
Members of the House of Commons of Canada from Ontario
Liberal Party of Canada MPs
Defence ministers of Canada
Canadian Ministers of Transport
Canadian monarchists
Politicians from London
Politicians from Toronto
Glendon College alumni